Rear Admiral Atul Anand, AVSM, VSM is a serving Flag officer in the Indian Navy. He currently serves as the Flag Officer Commanding Karnataka Naval Area. He earlier served as the Flag Officer Commanding Maharashtra Naval Area and as the Deputy Commandant and Chief Instructor of the National Defence Academy.

Early life and education
Anand was born in an armed forces family. His father attended the National Defence Academy (NDA) as part of the 13th course. Anand also attended the NDA, as part of the 71st course.

Naval career
Anand was commissioned into the Indian Navy on 1 January 1988. He is a specialist in Navigation and Direction. He also was the Direction Officer of the Sea Harrier Squadron INAS 300. He attended the Defence Services Command and Staff College in Dhaka, Bangladesh. He served as the Joint Director Staff Requirements at Naval headquarters.

Anand commanded the Astravahini-class torpedo recovery vessel A72, the Chamak-class missile boat  and the lead ship of her class of corvettes, . He served as the executive officer and the principal warfare officer of the lead ship of her class of guided missile destroyers . 
He then commanded Delhi's sister ship . In the rank of Captain, he served as Directing Staff at the Defence Services Staff College, Wellington Cantonment. At NHQ, he served as the Director Naval Operations and as the Director Naval Intelligence (Ops). He also attended the Advance Security Cooperation Course at the Asia-Pacific Center for Security Studies in Hawaii, USA.

As a Commodore, in 2013, Anand attended the National Defence College as part of the 53rd course. He then served as the Principal Director Naval Operations and as the Principal Director Strategy, Concepts and Transformation, both at NHQ. In January 2015, he was awarded the Vishisht Seva Medal for distinguished service.

Flag rank
Anand was promoted to flag rank and was appointed Assistant Chief of Naval Staff (Foreign Cooperation and Intelligence) at Naval headquarters. In June 2020, he moved to Pune and took over as the Deputy Commandant and Chief Instructor of his alma-mater, National Defence Academy. After an eight-month stint, he was appointed Flag Officer Maharashtra Naval Area (FOMA) in February 2021. He took over from Rear Admiral Vennam Srinivas on 22 February 2021. For his tenure as FOMA, he was awarded the Ati Vishisht Seva Medal on 26 January 2022. After a short tenure as FOMA, he moved to Karwar as the Flag Officer Commanding Karnataka Naval Area, taking over on 20 December 2021.

Awards and decorations

References

Indian Navy admirals
Living people
Year of birth missing (living people)
National Defence Academy (India) alumni
Defence Services Staff College alumni
National Defence College, India alumni
Recipients of the Ati Vishisht Seva Medal
Recipients of the Vishisht Seva Medal